Lauri may refer to:

 Lauri (given name), including a list of people with the name
 Lauri (surname), including a list of people with the name
 Lauri, Põlva County, a village in Estonia
 Lauri, Rapla County, a village in Estonia
 Lauri, Võru County, a village in Estonia

See also
 Lauria (disambiguation)
 Laurie (disambiguation)
 Lauris (given name)
 Laur (surname)
 Lorry
 Lurie
 Villa Lauri